Anatol Țăranu (born 19 October 1951) is a Moldovan politician.

Biography 

Țăranu holds a Ph.D. in history, 1986, and served as member of the Parliament of Moldova (1990–1993, 2005–2009). Țăranu has also been a chief expert for the Chişinău side during negotiations with separatist leaders in Transnistria. Between 1993 and 1995, Țăranu was Moldovan Ambassador to Moscow, and between 1997 and 1998 he was an advisor with special missions to the President of the Republic of Moldova. At the third congress of the Social Democratic Party, 25–26 February 1995, Anatol Țăranu was elected as a new head of the party.

After 2005 parliamentary election, Anatol Țăranu was excluded from Party Alliance Our Moldova. On 16 December 2006 Țăranu became a deputy chairman of the new National Liberal Party; Țăranu left the party in November 2008 because he disagreed with the party's decision to stand for parliament in 2009 jointly with the European Action Movement.

He currently works as Director of the Political Science and Political History Centre of the State University of Moldova and at the History Institute of the Academy of Sciences of Moldova, where he worked before becoming a deputy.

References

External links 
 Cine au fost şi ce fac deputaţii primului Parlament din R. Moldova (1990-1994)?
 Declaraţia deputaţilor din primul Parlament
 Site-ul Parlamentului Republicii Moldova

Writers from Chișinău
1951 births
Living people
20th-century Moldovan historians
Moldovan MPs 1990–1994
Moldovan MPs 2005–2009
Popular Front of Moldova MPs
Electoral Bloc Democratic Moldova MPs
Our Moldova Alliance politicians
Ambassadors of Moldova to Russia
Diplomats from Chișinău
Moldovan journalists
Male journalists
Politicians from Chișinău
Moldovan male writers
National Liberal Party (Moldova) politicians
Academic staff of Moldova State University
21st-century Moldovan historians